Palimpsest is a horror podcast created by Jamieson Ridenhour and Hayley Heninger with music by Ian Ridenhour.

Background 
The show is a slow-paced psychological horror and ghost story. The first season is composed of a series of audio diaries recorded by Anneliese. In the wake of her sister Claire’s death, Anneliese moves to a new apartment and begins seeing and hearing things that aren't there. The story is read by a single narrator. The show was created by Jamieson Ridenhour and Hayley Heninger. The show releases episodes on a bi-weekly basis and the music is composed by Ian Ridenhour. The first four seasons are each a ten part series. The show is produced in Asheville, NC. The show released its third season in 2020.

See also 

 List of horror podcasts

References

External links 
 

Audio podcasts
2017 podcast debuts
Horror podcasts
American podcasts